Granemore is a townland of 785 acres in County Armagh, Northern Ireland, about seven miles from Armagh and three miles from Keady. It is situated in the civil parish of Keady and historic barony of Armagh.

History

The Troubles
The local pub, The Rock Bar, was attacked by loyalists in June 1976 in a planned gun and bomb attack. However, a local resident left the bar as the loyalists were planting their device and disrupted their plan. Although the local man was shot a number of times, he managed to survive the incident. It was later revealed that some members of the Royal Ulster Constabulary (RUC) police force from Keady were involved with the attack.

Granemore is one of the townlands that make up the parish of Kilcluney. One of the three churches of the parish in Granemore is St Mary's Church,  neighboring St Mary's Primary School.

Sport
It is home to the local Gaelic Athletic Association (GAA) club Granemore GFC, which includes both senior and underage football and camogie teams.

References

Townlands of County Armagh
Civil parish of Keady